Like a Brother is the only collaborative album by America's Gerry Beckley, Chicago's Robert Lamm, and the Beach Boys' Carl Wilson. It was also the final studio album by Wilson. It was released in 2000, two years after Wilson had died from lung cancer, and it was the last album he recorded before his death. The trio first appeared together on a rendition of "Without Her" from the 1995 Harry Nilsson tribute album For the Love of Harry: Everybody Sings Nilsson, followed by "Watching The Time Go By" from Lamm's 1999 solo album In My Head.

Track listing

Personnel 
 Gerry Beckley – lead and backing vocals, acoustic guitar, mandolin
 Robert Lamm – lead and backing vocals, keyboards
 Carl Wilson – lead and backing vocals, electric guitar
 Timmy Cappello – saxophone
 Paul Livant – electric guitar
 Steve Tarshis – electric guitar
 Michael Thompson – guitar
 John Van Tongeren – keyboards
 Tom Hammer – keyboards
 Phil Galdston – keyboards, programming
 Van Dyke Parks – accordion
 Jason Scheff – bass
 Jimmy Hunter – drums
 Sandy Merendino – drums
 Michael Fisher – percussion

References 

2000 albums
Carl Wilson albums
Collaborative albums